"Raspberry Beret" is a song written by American musician Prince and the lead single from Prince & the Revolution's 1985 album Around the World in a Day.

Background
The sound of the song expanded upon previous Prince arrangements, incorporating stringed instruments, Middle Eastern finger cymbals, and a harmonica on the extended version. The song was also more in the pop vein than before, though the 12-inch single and video of the song feature a funky intro.

The song tells of a teenage romance and first sexual experience with a girl who wears a raspberry-colored beret. The extended version was included on the compilation album Ultimate in 2006. While the song hit number one in Cash Box and reached number two on the Billboard Hot 100 in the US (behind "A View to a Kill" by Duran Duran), it only reached number 25 on the UK Singles Chart.

Releases
The US B-side, "She's Always in My Hair", is a rock and roll number, with guitar and organs and emotional lyrics screamed toward the end. The UK B-side was "Hello", which was included on the U.S. release of "Pop Life".

Reception
Cash Box described the single as "an immediately accessible track, melodic and teasingly sexual."

Following Prince's death, "Raspberry Beret" re-charted on the Billboard Hot 100 at number 33 on the chart dated the week of May 14, 2016. As of April 30, 2016, it has sold 691,421 copies in the United States.

Music video
The video for the song was directed primarily by Prince, with animation created by Colossal Pictures co-founder Drew Takahashi. It combines footage of Prince & The Revolution performing the song surrounded by dancers and overlaid with various animations. The video uses an extended version of the song with a longer intro. Guitarist Pat Smear of Germs and Foo Fighters fame, appears as one of the background dancers in the video but, according to bandmate Dave Grohl, he was nearly fired. In the 2010 book I Want My MTV, Grohl elaborates further: "everyone has to do a synchronized dance. Pat can't dance so they sent him home[...] Prince whispers in the bodyguard's ear. The bodyguard says, "You can stay. He likes your hair."

In the same book, producer Simon Fields also recalls production on the video: "For 'Raspberry Beret', we filmed a whole video, then Prince got a Japanese animator to do a completely different video and we mashed the two up."

In an interview with Earl Jones, Jones recalls that Prince damaged his hair so poorly prior to the Raspberry Beret video that "the hairstyle... was literally all I could do with it."

Live performances

"Raspberry Beret" remained a perennial live favourite in Prince's concerts for many years. It was initially performed in a full version for his 1986 Hit N Run World Tour whilst later performances including those on his Lovesexy Tour feature it as a stripped-down piece performed solely by Prince on piano, often as part of a medley with other songs from around the same period.

Warren Zevon performed the song on Late Show with David Letterman. Zevon had previously recorded a version as part of the Hindu Love Gods, which was released in 1990.

Legacy
"Raspberry Beret" is widely considered one of Prince's finest songs. In 2016, Paste ranked the song number eight on their list of the 50 greatest Prince songs, and in 2022, American Songwriter ranked the song number four on their list of the 10 greatest Prince songs.

Track listings
 US 7″ single
A. "Raspberry Beret" – 3:31
B. "She's Always in My Hair" – 3:27

 US 12" single
A. "Raspberry Beret (New Mix)" – 6:34
B. "She's Always in My Hair (New Mix)" – 6:32

 UK 7" single
A. "Raspberry Beret" – 3:31
B. "Hello" – 3:23

 UK 12″ single
A. "Raspberry Beret (New Mix)" – 6:34
B. "Hello (Extended Remix)" – 6:23

Personnel
Information taken from the Prince Vault website.

1982 version
 Prince – all vocals and instruments (assumed)

1984 version
 Prince – all vocals and instruments, except where noted
 Wendy Melvoin – background vocals
 Lisa Coleman – background vocals
 Susannah Melvoin – background vocals
 Novi Novog – violin
 David Coleman – cello
 Suzie Katayama – cello

Charts

Certifications

References

1985 singles
Cashbox number-one singles
Music videos directed by Prince (musician)
Paisley Park Records singles
Prince (musician) songs
Song recordings produced by Prince (musician)
Songs written by Prince (musician)
Warner Records singles
Psychedelic pop songs
1984 songs
Berets